The Gospel Of Gospel  is a 2001 TV documentary made by independent production company Lion Television for Channel 4 in the UK. It was presented by the singer Mica Paris. It was produced and directed by David Upshal.

The documentary traces the story of how the tradition of Gospel music from America's black churches has inspired some of the biggest artists in mainstream popular music. It features rare footage of some of the greats of gospel, including Thomas A. Dorsey, Sister Rosetta Tharpe and The Edwin Hawkins Singers.

Along the way, Mica Paris sings with the choir at the church founded by Aretha Franklin's father, the legendary gospel performer Reverend C.L. Franklin, jams with Robert Randolph and the Family Band and duets with Chaka Khan.

Interviewees include Ray Charles, Isaac Hayes, Al Green, B.B. King, Chaka Khan, Alexander O'Neal, Edwin Hawkins, Mary Mary and The Blind Boys Of Alabama.

The show was commissioned by British network Channel 4, by the network's commissioning editor for religion Elizabeth Clough, alongside a talent contest for gospel performers.

References 

British television documentaries